Rémi Cabral (born 10 July 1999) is a French professional footballer who plays as a midfielder for Colorado Rapids 2 in MLS Next Pro.

Career
Cabral was a part of the Paris Saint-Germain youth system before signing with FC Metz in France’s Ligue 1 in June 2017, where he made 23 appearances for the club's B team. In 2019, Cabral joined Valenciennes FC.

On 27 April 2021, Cabral moved to the United States to join USL Championship side LA Galaxy II. On 9 February 2023, Cabral again followed his brother, Kevin, joining Colorado Rapids 2 in the MLS Next Pro.

Personal
Rémi's twin brother, Kévin, plays for LA Galaxy.

References

1999 births
Living people
Footballers from Paris
Association football midfielders
French footballers
French sportspeople of Cape Verdean descent
Paris Saint-Germain F.C. players
FC Metz players
Valenciennes FC players
LA Galaxy II players
Colorado Rapids 2 players
Championnat National 3 players
USL Championship players
MLS Next Pro players
Expatriate soccer players in the United States
French expatriate footballers
French expatriate sportspeople in the United States
Twin sportspeople